Life Gets You Dirty is the fourth studio album by Finnish glam rock singer Michael Monroe, released on 12 October 1999, through the German label SPV GmbH.

Track listing

Personnel
Michael Monroe - lead vocals, guitar, harmonica, saxophone, piano, tambourine
Jari Paulamäki - bass, backing vocals
Pete Lehtelä - drums, backing vocals
Jude Wilder - backing vocals

Michael Monroe albums
1999 albums